Fred Hill (1900 – death date unknown) was an American Negro league infielder in the 1920s.

A native of Texas, Hill played for the Milwaukee Bears in 1923. In 18 recorded games, he posted 12 hits in 66 plate appearances.

References

External links
 and Seamheads

Date of birth missing
Year of death missing
Place of birth missing
Place of death missing
Milwaukee Bears players
Baseball infielders
Baseball players from Texas
1900 births